Jaynetta Carrol Saunders (born August 21, 1979) is a former professional basketball player. She played in Europe (FIBA) and the United States (WNBA).

References

1979 births
Living people
American women's basketball players
Junior college women's basketball players in the United States
Phoenix Mercury players
Texas A&M Aggies women's basketball players
Forwards (basketball)